Gregory Motton (born September 1961) is a British playwright and author. Best known for the originality of his formally demanding, largely a-political theatre plays at the Royal Court in the 1980s and 1990s, state of the nation satires in the 1990s, and later for his polemics about working class politics, A Working Class Alternative To Labour and Helping Themselves – The Left Wing Middle Classes In Theatre And The Arts.

He speaks fluent Swedish and is one of the chief translators of Strindberg's plays, known for his strict advocacy of translations rather than versions.

Early life
Gregory Motton was born in September 1961 in Wood Green in the London borough of Enfield the second child of Bernadette (née Clancy) from Rosscarbery in West Cork, Ireland, a bar-maid, and David Motton, of Tottenham, London, a writer of children's comics. He attended St. Angela's Convent, St. Paul's School, and Winchmore Comprehensive.

Early career
Gregory Motton's first two plays went on in quick succession: Chicken (directed by Kate Harwood) at the Riverside Studios in April 1987, and then Ambulance (directed by Lindsay Posner) at the Royal Court in September 1987. His unconventional writing style soon dispersed the initial keen interest it had first awakened in managements and critics. His third play, Downfall, again directed by Lindsay Posner at the Royal Court in July 1988, contained 56 very brief scenes, 26 characters and a fragmented illogical structure. It brought fierce condemnation from the critics, an empty theatre, and an end of the Royal Court's interest in Motton for several years.

His fourth play, Looking at You (revived) Again commissioned originally by the National Theatre Studio, continued with the lyrical aspects of the previous plays but with a more economical technique . It followed a simple story but had a more or less non-naturalistic lyrical form. Rejected by Peter Gill, the then artistic director of the National Theatre Studio, it did not receive a rehearsed reading. It was produced by Simon Usher at the Leicester Haymarket in June 1989, during the period of David Gothard's co-artistic directorship. The play was transferred to the Bush Theatre by Jenny Killick, was unanimously disliked by the critics, and the theatre was empty once again.

Consequently, it was not until a further three years later that two of Motton's plays were produced,  almost simultaneously: A Message for the Broken Hearted, directed by Ramin Gray, March 1993, at the Liverpool Everyman; and The Terrible Voice of Satan, directed by James MacDonald, July 1993, at the Royal Court, now being run by Stephen Daldry. (Motton and Gray formed the Ducks and Geese Theatre Company to bring the former play to London, at the Battersea Arts Centre. They subsequently worked together directing a number of Motton's plays in France.)

Both plays met with almost universal disapproval by the critics, and Motton's brief career in Britain was effectively over. Excepting A Little Election Satire for one week at the Gate Theatre in 1997 under David Farr, it was to be another twelve years before one of his plays was produced there. His plays remained out of print in English until 1997 when James Hogan of Oberon Books began the re-publication of all his plays in several volumes.

France
During that period his plays were premiered in Paris. Notable productions were by the director Claude Régy(Downfall 1992 and Terrible Voice of Satan Oct 1994), and also by the director Éric Vigner (Looking at You (revived) Again - "Reviens à toi (encore)" 1994) at the Theatre de l'Odeon*, while the play was rejected by the NT Studio for a reading.  (Also premiered in that theatre was Loue Sois le Progress 1998).

During this period Motton wrote the "Gengis" series of satirical political plays (Cat and Mouse (Sheep), premiered at the Theatre de L'Odeon, Gengis Amongst the Pygmies, premiered at the Comedie Francaise, A Holiday in the Sun, premiered on Radio France Culture, and The Rape Of Europe).  The first of these, Cat And Mouse (Sheep), was directed by Ramin Gray and Gregory Motton in English, and this production was seen briefly in Britain at the Gate Theatre  under David Farr, a few months later.  All four plays  of that series have been the subject of public readings at the Royal Court, but never produced there.

British critic Michael Billington noted Motton's presence abroad, which he interpreted in the following manner: "Ignored in his native Britain, Gregory Motton is widely performed in France and, watching the premiere (at the Comedie Francaise) of his latest piece, it is not difficult to see why. Motton studiously rejects naturalism and instead offers a comic-strip satire on capitalist consumerism in the style of Jarry, Ionesco or Vian. He is like an absurdist with Marxist tendencies".(Guardian 2004)

Recent work
Motton's relationship with the Royal Court began again in 2005, during Ian Rickson's tenure. Rickson was not a natural enthusiast for Motton's work and was reluctant to produce any of his characteristically unconventional plays to which there had always been significant opposition. He decided against producing A Holiday in the Sun. which he had commissioned and which was the subject of a reading. He was finally persuaded to produce The World's Biggest Diamond in 2005 which is a largely conventional drama about a lifelong love affair. This starred Jane Asher and Michael Feast and, perhaps surprisingly, earned the Royal Court the only 5 star review it had so far received during Rickson's term there.

Ironically perhaps, Alex Sierz took this as a sign of a change in  Motton's writing "The World's Biggest Diamond by Gregory Motton (Royal Court) Is Motton our English Strindberg? This account of two lovers who meet for a weekend after 30 years seethes with Scandinavian gloom. But whatever happened to Motton's distinctively weird personal vision?" (Alex Sierz)

Motton's plays have been produced only once in the past 17 years in Britain and never, in Britain, in a theatre with more than 90 seats. It is perhaps for this reason that he is considered  by some commentators to have been rejected, along with some other writers, by the theatre establishment; Playwright Mark Ravenhill, wrote:
"The English theatre has for some 50 years told itself that it is a writers' theatre. It's odd, then, that the English theatre should have produced a substantial list of playwrights who have become alienated from our theatres, often at the peak of their power.In my imagination there's a strange hinterland, an empty multi-storey car park standing at a point equidistant from both the Royal Court and the National Theatres, where the shades of once-celebrated playwrights such as Arnold Wesker, John Arden, Howard Barker and Gregory Motton wander up and down".
To others Motton is a natural dissident because of the form and the content of his writing.  Dominic Dromgoole ("not a fan of Motton's work") calls him the Tony Benn or Dennis Skinner of playwriting.

Most recently, Gregory Motton has begun writing musicals. He wrote the music, lyrics and books of three in less than three years, having composed more than 60 songs. They are; Nefertiti and Akhenaten, The Mystery Of Hill Street and Dracula. He wrote a fourth Tristan and Yseult in 2014.
In 2014 he released a double CD album, called Damnation and Praise (Exile Music), containing a selection of 27 songs from 4 of his musicals.

In 2020 The Ice-Floe Girl was published as a memoir (Conrad Press 2021) "an account of an ephemeral beauty...an angelic Swedish au-pair."

Awards
In 2012, Strindberg's centenary year in Sweden, Motton was awarded the Swedish Writers Guild (Dramatikerförbundet) Göran O Eriksson Award for his translations of Strindberg. This award was presented on the stage of Strindbergs Intima Teater, in Stockholm. The jury's motivation for the award was "Gregory Motton is a very many-sided translator whose work is valued by a great number of authors. His translations of dramatic works of widely differing genres and styles, display a faithfulness which points to the kind of sensitivity, integrity and precision, that comes of great professional skill."

Theatre and politics
In various articles and interviews Motton has voiced some criticisms of British theatre, ("The Stage of Hollow Moralising")  Guardian 16 April 1992, reprinted Theatre Forum  Fall 1992, The Stage 1 April 1993, Whats On 5 May 1993, and most notably in the mid-1990s when he wrote an article about the high administrative staffing levels and low plays output of Britains regional theatres. Patrick Marmion wrote; "He stands aside from the mainstream orthodoxy of issue based writing....Now theatres are looking at his plays but remain edgy about what he may say in them."   Motton's comments about British theatre may have alienated theatres against him.

More recently he wrote a book, ( Helping Themselves- the Left Wing Middle Classes in Theatre and the Arts ), criticising the influence of the middle class left in both the arts and politics, and their effect on working class representation in politics.  It includes an examination of the working class identity of the Royal Court in the 1969s and 70s, with specific reference to the public school origins of many of their best known writers

This book was commissioned by Oberon Books, but was rejected by them for publication.  It is published by Levellers Press.  It was accepted for sale in the Royal Court bookshop by the Royal Court Artistic Director Dominic Cooke, despite its robust criticisms of that theatre.
No more of Motton's plays were published by Oberon Books subsequent to that date.

In December 2013 Motton published A Working Class Alternative to Labour a book outlining a collection of policies designed to remove poverty, by the means of a high statutory minimum wage and a return to manufacturing.  The central idea of the book is to shift money and economic activity from the top end of the economy to the lower end, and proposes a challenge to the predominance of large capital and its influence in our society, most notably by ending Britain's reliance on profits from investment in foreign industries (through investment banking) for the balance of payments.  He proposes a return to what is called 'traditional banking' where money from current accounts is invested in domestic industries.  He advocates free and untested access to grammar schools for all who want it, as a means of countering the predominance of a public school educated elite in positions of power.

There is a section describing the workings of the European Union, and a critique of its lack of democratic accountability.  He points out that the government of the EU (the executive) is not elected, and that the European Union elections, are only of MEPS and are therefore largely cosmetic since the executive is not drawn from the MEPS and cannot be removed by elections.

Motton portrays the EU as a largely capitalist organisation designed to drive down working class wages.  He characterises the EU's appropriation of political power, by-passing democracy, as a coup d'état by the administrative classes of Europe.  He gives evidence of a belief amongst EU leaders that political and economic decisions are best made without reference to democracy.  This book is now in the House of Commons Library.

Film
For Two Cities Films he has written and directed four full-length feature films, that make up a quartet of films called The Four Gospels of Dracula the Messiah.
Filming began in 2017 and ended in 2021. They are;
1 The Four Gospels of Dracula the Messiah, part one: A Voice Crying In The Wilderness. 1hr 16mins.
2 The Four Gospels of Dracula the Messiah, part two: Conquering Death. 1hr 16 mins.
3 The Four Gospels of Dracula the Messiah, part three: The Seducer. 1 hr 24 mins.
Part four is due to be released in January 2022,.
In 2022 he directed Lilith, also for Two Cities Films.

Selected works

Plays include 
Chicken (Penguin, Oberon) Riverside Studios 1987,
Ambulance (Penguin,/Oberon) Royal Court 1987,
Downfall (Methuen, Oberon ) Royal Court 1988,
Looking at You (Revived) Again, (Flood Books, Oberon) Leicester Haymarket  1989,
A Message for the Broken Hearted 1993 (Flood Books, Oberon) Liverpool Playhouse,
The Terrible Voice of Satan (Flood Books, Oberon) Royal Court 1993,
Cat and Mouse (Sheep) (Flood Books, Oberon) Theatre de L'Odeon 1995,
The Forest of Mirrors (Methuen) National Theatre Studio,
In Praise of Progress (Oberon) Theatre de L'Odeon 1999,
A Little Satire  (Oberon) Gate Theatre 1997,
God's Island (Oberon) Theatre de La Tempête 2001,
You Need Some of This, Théâtre de Gennevilliers,
Gengis Amongst the Pygmies (Oberon) Comedie Francaise 2004,
A Holiday In The Sun (Oberon) Radio France Culture 2005,
The World's Biggest Diamond (Oberon) Royal Court 2005,
The Rape Of Europe (Levellers Press 2011) Commissioned 2008, Calder Bookshop Theatre Jan 2013
Petrol (Levellers Press 2013) Gulbenkian Theatre March 2013

Short plays 
The Jug 1990   BBC Radio,
Lazy Bríen 1991   BBC Radio,
A Monologue (Oberon) Musee Dauphioise 1998,
The Mother,
Pirates.

Musicals 
The Mystery Of Hill Street  (Script, words and  music of 20 songs)2010
Nefertiti and Akhenaten (Script, words and music of 16 songs)2011
Dracula (Script, words and music of 27 songs, plus 5 instrumental pieces)2012

Books 
Helping Themselves - The Left Wing Middle Classes in Theatre and the Arts (Levellers Press 2009)
A Working Class Alternative To Labour (Levellers Press 2013)
The Ice-Floe Girl (Conrad Press 2020)

Translations from Swedish 
The Ghost Sonata (Oberon)
The Pelican		(Oberon),
Swanwhite		(Oberon),
The Burned Site	(Oberon),
The Storm		(Oberon),
The Father by August Strindberg	(Oberon),
Miss Julie	by August Strindberg. 	(Oberon),
Comrades	by August Strindberg	(Oberon),
Creditors	by August Strindberg	 (Oberon),
The Great Highway   (Oberon),
The Black Glove      (Oberon),
The Dance of Death   (Oberon),
Easter       (Oberon)

Translations from Norwegian
The Name  by Jon Fosse (Oberon),
Someone Is Going to Come  by Jon Fosse(Oberon)

Translations from German
Woyzeck  (Nick Hern Books)

References

Living people
English dramatists and playwrights
English satirists
Translators from Swedish
Translators from Norwegian
Translators from German
Translators to English
English translators
1961 births
Date of birth missing (living people)
English male dramatists and playwrights
People educated at Winchmore School
English male non-fiction writers